Plaza de toros Monumental de Aguascalientes is a bullring in the city of Aguascalientes, Mexico. It is currently used for bullfighting and concerts. The stadium holds 16,000 people and it was inaugurated on November 23, 1974. Its currently the 4th largest bullring in Mexico.

References

External links
 Official homepage
 www.worldstadiums.com

Sports venues in Aguascalientes
Aguascalientes